Cheung Siu-fai (born 4 February 1963), also known as Eddie Cheung, is a Hong Kong actor. He is best known for his many supporting or everyman roles similar to Liu Kai-chi.

Filmography

Television series

References

External links
 
 
 Cheung Siu-fai at the Hong Kong Cinemagic
 Cheung Siu-fai on LoveHKFilm.com
 Cheung Siu-fai on Sina Weibo

20th-century Hong Kong male actors
21st-century Hong Kong male actors
Hong Kong male film actors
Hong Kong male television actors
1963 births
Living people